Mosquitoes was an English association football club who played on Clapham Common, London. The club was founded in 1872 under the name Albert and changed its name to Mosquitoes before the 1875-76 season.

The club first entered the FA Cup in 1879-80.  In the first round, the club beat St Peter's Institute of Battersea Park, at a neutral ground in Nunhead.  In the second round the club lost 7-1 to Hendon, but had the consolation of playing the tie at the Kennington Oval, with Charles Alcock acting as the club's nominated umpire.  The club's goal was scored by J. B. Ginger, who had started the game as goalkeeper, but had been moved up front when the score was 3-0.

The club entered the FA Cup for the next four seasons, but only won one more tie.

Before the 1884-85 season, the club merged with the Lennox Association Football Club of Clapham, to form a new club, Dulwich F.C.

Colours

The club's colours under the name Albert were violet and black.  As Mosquitoes their colours were originally were black shirts with MFC on the breast, white knickerbockers, and black stockings.  By 1881 the club had changed to blue and white.

Grounds

The club originally played on Clapham Common, using the Prince of Wales public house as its changing rooms.  By 1881 the club had moved to Dulwich and was using the Greyhound pub, which had previously been used by the Grey Friars club, for its facilities.

References

Association football clubs established in 1872
1872 establishments in England
Association football clubs disestablished in 1884
Clapham
Defunct football clubs in London